Coke bottle styling is an automotive body design with a narrow center surrounded by flaring fenders which bears a general resemblance to a Coca-Cola classic glass contour bottle design. It was introduced by industrial designer Raymond Loewy on the radical 1962 Studebaker Avanti gran turismo.

The design was pioneered in fighter jets as a way of greatly reducing the sharp drag rise that occurs at transonic speed and supersonic speeds. Using this design often results in a pinch-waisted fuselage shape that National Advisory Committee for Aeronautics (NACA) labeled the design principle 'area rule,' and variously identified as coke bottle, wasp waist, or Marilyn Monroe shape. The design technique on automobiles provides a visual attraction but negligible performance improvement.

Development 

The exotic shapes of early supersonic fighter jets had a dramatic influence on automobile stylists. First the tailfin fad, which appeared in the mid-1950s and was on the decline by the early 1960s, then the "Coke bottle" look of severely wasp-waisted high-performance jet fighters such as the Northrop F5. The initial result was luxury performance automobiles, such as the 1962 Studebaker Avanti and 1963 Buick Riviera, which vaguely resembled bottles of Coca-Cola laid on their sides".

United States
Studebaker introduced the Raymond Loewy-designed Avanti gran turismo with pronounced Coke bottle look in 1962. The 1962 Pontiac full-size models also "had a subtle horizontal crease about halfway down [the bodyside] and a slight wasp-waist constriction at the doors which swelled out again in the rear quarters" One of the cleanest examples of the “Coke bottle” styling was the 1963 Buick Riviera, a pioneering personal luxury car. Chevrolet first applied the Coke bottle look on Bill Mitchell's 1963 Corvette Sting Ray.

By 1966, the General Motors A-body sedans received a mid-riff pinch and "hop up" fenders. Intermediates such as the Pontiac Tempest, Dodge Charger, and Ford Torino soon followed suit, as well as compacts such as the Ford Maverick and Plymouth Duster. General Motors also styled their "B" body full-size cars from 1965-68 with this style, which is most prominent on the "fastback" 2-door hardtop models. Chrysler's "interpretation of the Coke-bottle styling treatment to its struggling B-body cars ... [resulted in] ... smooth lines, subtly rounded curves, and near perfect proportions." Notable automobiles with this style include many of the muscle cars during this era, such as the Pontiac GTO, Chevrolet Camaro, and Dodge Charger.

Design "themes" such the "hop up" fenders became so pervasive across the industry that American Motors' all-new 1967 Rebel was criticized because "viewed from any angle, anyone other than an out-and-out car buff would have trouble distinguishing the Rebel from its GM, Ford, and Chrysler Corp. competition." Moreover, AMC discovered that compared to slab styling with deeply sculpted ridges, "the rounded "Coke-bottle" panels would be easier to make and the dies would last longer — an important cost consideration."

Author Clinton Walker described the archetypal product of Australian suburbia, the muscle car, with its "Coke bottle hip bump but the bare midriff of a go-go dancer?" According to automotive historian Darwin Holmstrom, Chevrolet "took it to its illogical extreme with the 1968 Corvette, though that car more closely resembled a prosthetic phallus than a Coke bottle".

By the late-1970s and early-1980s, cars like the Ford Fairmont and Chrysler K-cars moved towards straight lines. The Audi 5000 and Ford Taurus led towards functional aerodynamic styling.

International markets

This styling "was to be seen right across the marketplace and, before long, around the world". Japanese, European, and Australian automobiles also adopted this style during the 1970s. Japanese automaker Nissan offered this appearance on 1970s era Nissan Cedrics, Nissan Glorias, Nissan Laurels, Nissan Bluebirds, and Nissan Violets. Toyota also offered this appearance on the 1972-1976 Toyota Corona Mark II, the limited production sportscar called the Toyota 2000GT, and the Toyota Celica. Mitsubishi also adopted this appearance on the 1973-1980 Galant, and the 1973-1979 Lancer. The appearance was even used in popular culture in the Japanese anime Speed Racer's Mach 5.

Not all cars displayed the full "plan-view" Coke bottle styling, with the waist narrowing. Some of them, like the British Ford Cortina Mark III achieved a similar look in their profile with the front wing curving up over the front wheel area and a much more pronounced curve over the rear wheel arch.

Automotive examples 

AMC Ambassador (1967-1969) 
AMC Javelin (1968-1974) 
AMC Marlin (1967) 
AMC Rebel (1967-1969) 
Chevrolet Corvair (1965–1969) 
Chevrolet Impala (fourth generation) (1965–1970) 
Studebaker Avanti (1963-1964) 
Hyundai Elantra (2007-2010)

Gallery

References

Automotive styling features